is a collaborative album by Japanese rock band Radwimps and composer Kazuma Jinnouchi. It is the soundtrack to the 2022 Japanese animated film of the same name. The album was released worldwide on November 11, 2022, the day of the film's release, by EMI Records and Muzinto Records. In 2023, it won Best Music at the 46th Japan Academy Film Prize.

Background
In September 2022, it was announced that Radwimps, who had previously worked with director Makoto Shinkai on the anime films Your Name (2016) and Weathering with You (2019), would be composing the score for Suzume, as a collaboration with Seattle-based composer Kazuma Jinnouchi. The project began in early 2020 when Shinkai sent the film's screenplay to vocalist Yojiro Noda, who found it "the most exciting" in comparison to Shinkai's previous two films, since Noda enjoyed road movies and was interested in abandoned buildings. The two stopped contacting for a while due to the COVID-19 pandemic, but Noda was able to write some music during that time.

Around August 2020, Noda sent Shinkai some demo tracks, which includes an early version of the first theme song "Suzume". Shinkai initially wanted Noda to perform "Suzume", but they later decided that a female voice would "better define the impression of the track." The production team held auditions, and singer Toaka was selected as the vocalist. Toaka had been posting on TikTok since February 2020, releasing covers of songs from Japanese artists such as Kenshi Yonezu, Fujii Kaze, and Wednesday Campanella. Noda said that he "felt a connection between this song and Toaka that no one else could break." The second theme song "Kanata Haluka" was produced at the last minute since Shinkai wanted another song for the film. For "Kanata Haluka", Noda wanted to tell about how the film is "a story about Suzume and Sota," regardless of the various themes it explores. Noda also performed the songs "Tamaki" and "Tears of Suzume", which are not included in the film.

Some of the recordings were held at Abbey Road Studios in London, which marks the first time a Shinkai film had an overseas session. Noda and Jinnouchi were present to give instructions to the orchestra in charge of performing.

Release
"Suzume" and "Kanata Haluka" debuted on music streaming services on September 30 and October 28, 2022, respectively. The album was released worldwide on November 11, 2022, the day of the film's release. A music video for "Kanata Haluka", directed by filmmaker , was released online on the same day. The album was also released as a vinyl LP on March 8, 2023.

Radwimps and Toaka performed the theme songs on TV Asahi's Music Station program on November 11, and on TBS's CDTV Live! Live! program on November 28.

Track listing

Charts

Weekly charts

Monthly charts

References

External links
 

2022 soundtrack albums
Album chart usages for Oricon
Animated film soundtracks
Anime soundtracks
Collaborative albums
Radwimps albums
EMI Records soundtracks
Universal Music Japan albums